Delta Park is one of the biggest parks in Randburg, Johannesburg, South Africa. It is adjacent to the suburbs of Blairgowrie and Victory Park. It comprises 108 hectares of grassland and woodland, and three tree-lined dams. It has walking trails, a "sensory trail" and bird watching hides. It incorporates the Florence Bloom Bird Sanctuary and the Delta Environmental Centre. The latter offers wildlife-related courses to adults and children, including holiday programmes; about 20 000 children take part in the programmes every year.

See also
Emmarentia Dam
Johannesburg City Parks

External links
Delta Park, jhbcityparks.com

Parks in Johannesburg
Birdwatching sites